Cry Like a Baby is a 1968 album by the Box Tops. The title song was released as a single and reached #2 in April 1968 on the Billboard Hot 100 chart, a position which it held for two weeks. It was kept out of the top spot by Bobby Goldsboro's "Honey".

Background
The original vinyl album concludes with a slow version of the "You Keep Me Hangin' On", which was a hit for The Supremes in the fall of 1966. The Box Tops version is similar to, but shorter than, the version recorded by Vanilla Fudge on its 1967 debut album. Musician and record producer Jim Dickinson said of this album that it was "Memphis pop production at its best, on par with the great Dusty In Memphis, recorded by the same cast of characters in the same period. Those two records were as good as it gets." According to Alex Chilton biographer Holly George-Warren, the studio band for all tracks except "You Keep Me Hangin' On" was the house band at America Sound Studio, sometimes known as "The Memphis Boys", augmented by Spooner Oldham on keyboards and other musicians playing brass, woodwind, and stringed instruments. The Box Tops themselves accompanied Chilton on "You Keep Me Hanging On".

Reception

Writing for Allmusic, music critic Steve Kurutz called the title song "a perfect slice of blue-eyed soul" and summarized; "All in all, with the exception of "Cry Like a Baby," an album that could've potentially contained some real gems just doesn't."

Track listing
All tracks composed by Dan Penn and Spooner Oldham; except where indicated
"Cry Like a Baby" – 2:32
"Deep in Kentucky" (Bill Davidson) – 2:09
"I'm the One for You" (Harold Thomas, Lee W. Jones, Jr.) – 3:03
"Weeping Analeah" (Dan Folger, Mickey Newbury) – 3:02
"Everytime" – 2:33
"Fields of Clover" – 2:49
"Trouble with Sam" (Dan Penn) – 2:14
"Lost" (Glen Spreen, Mark James) – 2:27
"Good Morning Dear" (Mickey Newbury) – 3:38
"727" – 2:16
"You Keep Me Hangin' On" (Holland–Dozier–Holland) – 3:45

CD bonus tracks
"Cry Like a Baby" (Digitally Remastered) – 2:32
"The Door You Closed to Me" - 2:39
"You Keep Tightening Up On Me" (Wayne Carson Thompson) – 2:52
"Come on Honey" (Alex Chilton) – 3:24
"Take Me to Your Heart" (Billy Wade McKnight) - 2:36

Personnel
Alex Chilton – lead vocals, guitar
Bill Cunningham – bass
John Evans – keyboards
Danny Smythe – drums
Gary Talley – guitar, background vocals
Rick Allen - bass, keyboards
Thomas Boggs - drums
Tommy Cogbill - bass
Reggie Young - guitar
The Memphis Horns - horns
Gene Chrisman - drums
Dan Penn - producer
Spooner Oldham - keyboards
Terry Manning - engineer, harpsichord
with:
Mike Leech - string arrangements
Frank Lerner - cover photography

References

External links
Classic Rock Bands: Box Tops
Interview with Box Tops bassist Bill Cunningham

1968 albums
Bell Records albums
Sundazed Records albums
The Box Tops albums
Albums produced by Chips Moman